Down the River of Golden Dreams is the second full-length studio album by Okkervil River, released on September 2, 2003. William Schaff continued to create artwork for Okkervil River with this release. The record label Jagjaguwar released the album on CD and vinyl under the catalog number JAG54.

Track listing

Personnel
Okkervil River
Will Sheff - Vocals, Guitar, Whirlies
Jonathan Meiburg - Vocals, Piano, Hammond organ, Wurlizter, Rhodes, Mellotron, Banjo, Tambourine
Zachary Thomas - Vocals, Electric Bass, Mandolin
Seth Warren - Vocals, Drums, Whirlies
Michi Aceret - Viola
Geoffrey Hershberger - Cello
Thomas Heyman - Pedal steel guitar
Alan Molina - Violin
John Vanderslice - Bells

The First National Brass
Katie Curran - Trombone
Dan Eastwood - Trumpet
Graham Taylor - Trumpet

Technical personnel
Okkervil River - Producer
Scott Solter - Recording
Billy Stull - Mastering 
Cover Art - William Schaff
Darius Van Arman - Layout and Design

External links
Album summary by Okkervil River
"It Ends With a Fall" music video

References

2003 albums
Okkervil River albums
Jagjaguwar albums